The following is a list of fictional astronauts from the era of Project Gemini and the Voskhod programme, during the early "Golden Age" of space travel.

Project Gemini era

Notes

References

Lists of fictional astronauts